Junction is a San Francisco-based online investment platform that allows accredited investors to purchase limited partnership interests in funds that invest in major motion pictures. It differs from donation-based crowdfunding for film as members of Junction receive investments indirectly in the film projects rather than gifts, and the projects listed on Junction are already fully financed. Investors become limited partners in a fund that has economic exposure to the project through an investment agreement with one of the film's financiers.

Junction's business is facilitated by the United States Jumpstart Our Business Startups Act, the passage of which in 2012 created new avenues for companies to solicit investments.

History
Junction was founded in 2012 by Adam Kaufman, a former Goldman Sachs banker, and Brian Goldsmith, a former CBS News producer. As of March 2014, their team includes a former Google engineer, a onetime technology employee at Goldman, and a former lawyer at Cravath, Swaine & Moore. Their advisors include Steve Wynn, Jason Blum and Logan Green.

Financiers including Worldview Entertainment, Endgame Entertainment, PalmStar Media, QED International and Silver Reel are reported to be working with Junction .

In October 2014, the European equity crowdfunding platform Seedrs announced the acquisition of Junction.

See also 
 Comparison of crowd funding services
 JOBS Act

References 

Financial services companies established in 2012
Defunct crowdfunding platforms of the United States
Private equity firms of the United States
Financial services companies based in California
Defunct companies based in California